Melanella amblytera is a species of sea snail, a marine gastropod mollusk in the family Eulimidae. The species is one of many species known to exist within the genus, Melanella.

Distribution
This species occurs in the Gulf of Mexico and in the Caribbean Sea; also in the tropical Northwestern Atlantic: Floridian, Bermuda, Bahamian, Southern Caribbean; tropical Southwestern Atlantic: Eastern Brazil.

References

 Rosenberg, G., F. Moretzsohn, and E. F. García. 2009. Gastropoda (Mollusca) of the Gulf of Mexico, Pp. 579–699 in Felder, D.L. and D.K. Camp (eds.), Gulf of Mexico–Origins, Waters, and Biota. Biodiversity. Texas A&M Press, College Station, Texas.

External links
 Verrill A.E. and Bush K.J. (1900). Additions to the marine Mollusca of the Bermudas. Transactions of the Connecticut Academy of Arts and Sciences 10: 513-544
 Souza L.S. de & Pimenta A.D. (2019). Taxonomy of littoral Melanella (Gastropoda: Eulimidae) from Brazil, with comments on the Eulima described by Verrill and Bush (1900). Marine Biodiversity. 49(1): 425-442

Eulimidae
Gastropods described in 1900